This is a list of countries by primary aluminium production. Primary aluminium is produced from aluminium oxide which is obtained from bauxite and excludes recycled aluminium. Only countries with a minimum production of 100,000 tonnes are listed.

See also
 List of countries by aluminium oxide production
 List of aluminium smelters

References

	

Aluminium
Lists of countries by mineral production